Ronan Park refers to recreational areas in:
 Albany Park, Chicago, Illinois
 Dorchester, Boston, Massachusetts